In enzymology, a trypanothione-disulfide reductase is an enzyme that catalyzes the chemical reaction

trypanothione + NADP+  trypanothione disulfide + NADPH + H+

Thus, the two substrates of this enzyme are trypanothione and NADP+, whereas its 3 products are trypanothione disulfide, NADPH, and H+.

This enzyme belongs to the family of oxidoreductases, specifically those acting on a sulfur group of donors with NAD+ or NADP+ as acceptor.  The systematic name of this enzyme class is trypanothione:NADP+ oxidoreductase. Other names in common use include trypanothione reductase, and NADPH2:trypanothione oxidoreductase.  It employs one cofactor, FAD.

The X-ray crystal structures of trypanothione reductase enzymes from several trypanosomatids species have been solved, including those from Crithidia fasciculata, Leishmania infantum, Trypanosoma brucei and Trypanosoma cruzi. The structures reveal that trypanothione reductase forms homodimers in solution with each of the two individual subunits comprising an FAD-binding domain, an NADPH-binding domain and an interface domain. Examples of trypanothione reductase inhibitors include 5-Nitro-Imidazole, Febrifugine, Imipramine  and Benzoxaborole.

References

 
 
 
 

EC 1.8.1
NADPH-dependent enzymes
Flavoproteins
Enzymes of unknown structure